Adderley Park is an area in the east of Birmingham, England. Charles Adderley MP donated  of land to create the park, which he managed privately from 1855 to 1864. The park was opened to the public on 30 August 1856. At the park's entrance were buildings housing a library, reading room and museum. The buildings have since been demolished.

The area is served by Adderley Park railway station.

References

Parks and open spaces in Birmingham, West Midlands